Leandros Lillis (born 13 September 1996) is a Cypriot footballer who plays for Alki Oroklini as a midfielder.

References

1996 births
Living people
Cypriot footballers
Cypriot expatriate footballers
Cyprus youth international footballers
Association football midfielders
Alki Larnaca FC players
AEL Limassol players
Ermis Aradippou FC players
Temple Owls football players
Alki Oroklini players
Cypriot First Division players
Cypriot Second Division players
Expatriate soccer players in the United States